Rêve En Vert is an online luxury boutique focusing on high-end sustainable products. It has been referred to as “the Net-a-Porter of sustainable fashion.” Currently the e-commerce site comprises womenswear, accessories and jewellery, as well as organic homeware and beauty products.

History
Rêve En Vert was founded in 2013 by Cora Hilts and Natasha Tucker and was born from a blog that Hilts started during her Masters course in Environmental Politics and Sustainability.

Products
The e-commerce site stocks a selection of brands that are in line with its sustainable ethos, including "re-made" British bags from Christopher Raeburn, womenswear pieces from Svilu as well as jewellery from Pamela Love. It also possesses a line of organic Pima cotton basics and a line of beach resort wear.

References

Clothing brands